Jan Frank Hansen (born 16 December 1957 in Hvidovre) is a Danish curler.

At the national level, he is a four-time Danish men's champion curler (1979, 1982, 1987, 1988) and two-time Danish mixed champion curler (1980, 1954).

He participated in the curling demonstration event at the 1988 Winter Olympics, where the Danish men's team finished sixth.

Teams

Men's

Mixed

References

External links

Living people
1957 births
Danish male curlers
Danish curling champions
Curlers at the 1988 Winter Olympics
Olympic curlers of Denmark
People from Hvidovre Municipality
Sportspeople from the Capital Region of Denmark
20th-century Danish people